Metisella decipiens is a butterfly in the family Hesperiidae. It is found in Malawi and southern Tanzania.

References

Butterflies described in 1896
Heteropterinae
Butterflies of Africa
Taxa named by Arthur Gardiner Butler